Saeed Gul is a Pakistani politician who had been a Member of the Provincial Assembly of Khyber Pakhtunkhwa, from May 2013 to May 2018. Previously he had been a member of the Provincial Assembly of the North-West Frontier Province from 2002 to 2007.

Education
He has a Master of Arts degree.

Political career
He was elected to the Provincial Assembly of the North-West Frontier Province as a candidate of Muttahida Majlis-e-Amal from Constituency PF-96 (Lower Dir-III) in 2002 Pakistani general election. He received 10,326 votes and defeated a candidate of Pakistan Peoples Party (PPP).

He was re-elected to the Provincial Assembly of Khyber Pakhtunkhwa as a candidate of Jamaat-e-Islami Pakistan from Constituency PK-96 (Lower Dir-III) in 2013 Pakistani general election. He received 14,193 votes and defeated a candidate of PPP.

References

Living people
Khyber Pakhtunkhwa MPAs 2013–2018
Jamiat Ulema-e-Islam (F) politicians
North-West Frontier Province MPAs 2002–2007
Year of birth missing (living people)